Torbjørn Olsen (born November 10, 1953) is a Norwegian priest that on November 9, 2006 was elected Diocesan Administrator of the see of Tromsø, following the sudden death of Bishop Gerhard Goebel. He served in this position until Berislav Grgic was installed as the new Bishop of Tromso on March 28, 2009. He holds a Cand. Theol. degree from the Norwegian Menighetsfakultetet since 1977, and he worked for about a decade as a priest in the Norwegian Church, including as a military chaplain. In 1989 he converted to Catholicism. He took the diploma degree in Catholic theology at the John-Gutenberg Universität in Mainz in 1991 and was ordained a priest in Tromsø on September 8, 1991 by Bishop Gerhard Goebel. With his thesis "Die Natur des Militärordinariats", he became the first Norwegian in recent times to take a doctorate in canon law (Doctor in iure Canonico) on February 3, 1999 at the Pontifical University of Gregorian in Rome.

Olsen has worked in various functions in the Catholic Church in Norway, and in 1998 became Vicar General of Trondheim. In December 2003 he was appointed honorary chaplain to His Holiness with the title Monsignor.

Literature
Die Natur des Militärordinariats, 1998, Berlin: Duncker & Humblot

External links
Msgr Olsen's biography at katolsk.no (in Norwegian)

Converts to Roman Catholicism
Converts to Roman Catholicism from Lutheranism
Norwegian Roman Catholic priests
1953 births
Living people